The 2022 Milan Ciga Vasojević Cup is the 16th season of the Serbian women's national basketball cup tournament, scheduled to be held from 11 to 12 March 2022 in Niš, Serbia.

Qualification
Source

Qualified teams
 Section 1: Crvena zvezda mts
 Section 2: Kraljevo
 Section 3: Art Basket
 Section 4: Vojvodina 021

Section 1

Section 2

Section 3

Section 4

Venue

Draw
The draw was conducted in the Tami hotel in Niš on Monday 7 March 2022.

Bracket

Semifinals

Kraljevo v Crvena zvezda mts

Art Basket v Vojvodina 021

Final

See also
 2021–22 First Women's Basketball League of Serbia
 2021–22 Radivoj Korać Cup

References

External links
 
 2021–22 Milan Ciga Vasojević Cup at srbijasport.net

Milan Ciga Vasojević Cup
Milan Ciga Vasojević Cup
Milan Ciga Vasojević Cup